Donji grad ("Lower Town") may refer to:

 Donji grad, Zagreb, Croatia
 Donji grad, Osijek, Croatia
 Donji Grad, Zemun, Serbia

See also 
 Gornji Grad (disambiguation)
 Stari Grad (disambiguation)
 Novi Grad (disambiguation)
 Grad (toponymy)